Coenotephria ablutaria is a moth of the family Geometridae. It was described by Jean Baptiste Boisduval in 1840. It is found in Spain, France, Italy, Austria, Switzerland, Slovenia, Bulgaria, Romania, Serbia, Croatia, Albania, North Macedonia, Greece, Ukraine, as well as on Sardinia, Corsica, Sicily, Malta, Crete and Cyprus. Outside of Europe, it is found in Asia Minor and the Near East.

The wingspan is 19–27 mm.

The larvae probably feed on Galium species.

References

Moths described in 1840
Larentiinae
Moths of Europe
Taxa named by Jean Baptiste Boisduval